Frank J. Hugh O'Donnell (4 April 1894 – 4 November 1976) was an Irish critic, playwright and politician.

O'Donnell was born at Shop Street, Tuam to John O'Donnell and his wife Delia (née Carr) but spent his childhood in Milltown, County Galway. O'Donnell was enrolled in Milltown National School in November 1902 aged eight and left in June 1909 aged fifteen. He and his brother Patrick O'Donnell worked in the family business in Tuam before moving to Dublin to work in the clothing industry. He was a published critic of music, literature and theatrical performances, and wrote a weekly letter in the Gael, a weekly paper. He was also a playwright, having some of his works staged at the Abbey Theatre.

His first play The Dawn Mist (1919) follows a Galway family, the Egans, who lose two brothers and an uncle in the 1916 Easter Rising. The play became very popular, however; it was banned by the British authorise earning the title of "Ireland's most proclaimed [banned] play".

In 1943 he became a member of Seanad Éireann on the Industrial and Commercial Panel where he promoted Irish arts and culture. He lost his seat at the 1944 Seanad election, but was re-elected at the 1951 election. He was nominated by the Taoiseach to the Seanad in 1954.

O'Donnell had two children, Frank and Mary, with his second wife, Deirdre.

A collection of O'Donnell's papers and manuscripts dating from 1911 to 1974 kept at the University of Delaware Library, is open for research.

He bore almost the same name as a contemporary politician, Frank Hugh O'Donnell, also from County Galway.

Select bibliography
The Dawn Mist: A Play of the Rebellion, Gael Co-operative Society, 1919
The Drifters, 1920
Five minutes wait, Dublin, 1921
Keeper of the Light, 1925
Anti-Christ, 1925
O'Flaherty's Star, 1925
Futility

References

Galway Authors, Helen Mahar, 1976

External links
New Hibernia Review, Spring 2005

1894 births
1976 deaths
Politicians from County Galway
Members of the 4th Seanad
Members of the 7th Seanad
Members of the 8th Seanad
Nominated members of Seanad Éireann
Independent members of Seanad Éireann